HMS H48 was a British H class submarine built by William Beardmore and Company, Dalmuir. She was laid down on 30 November 1917 and was commissioned on 23 June 1919. It had a complement of twenty-two crew members. HMS H48 was sold on 30 August 1935 in Llanelly.

Design

H48 was fitted with an anti-aircraft gun and four  torpedo tubes. Its torpedo tubes were fitted to the bows and the submarine was loaded with eight  torpedoes. It is a Holland 602 type submarine but was designed to meet Royal Navy specifications. Its complement was twenty-two crew members.

References

Bibliography
 

 

British H-class submarines
Ships built on the River Clyde
1919 ships
Royal Navy ship names